Dragan Perić (born 8 May 1964) is a Serbian retired shot putter who occasionally competed in the discus throw. He holds the Serbian records in both events. He represented Yugoslavia/Serbia and Montenegro in four consecutive Summer Olympics from 1992 to 2004, in eight World Championships from 1991 to 2005 and three European Championships from 1990 to 1998.

Early career and international medals
He was born in Živinice, SR Bosnia and Herzegovina, but represented the clubs AK Sloboda Tuzla, AK Slavonija Osijek, AK Partizan and AK Crvena Zvezda in Belgrade. Before athletics, Dragan practised boxing. His former coaches were Nikola Tomasović, Dmitar Marceta and Veljko Čegar . His first European Championships was in 1990 in Split in his home country (then) Yugoslavia. Perić finished twelfth in the shot put final. He then finished seventh at the 1991 World Championships, seventh at the 1992 Olympic Games, fifth at the 1993 World Championships. In 1994 he won the silver medal at the European Indoor Championships, and finished sixth at both the 1994 European Championships and the IAAF Grand Prix Final. After that he won the bronze medal at the 1995 World Indoor Championships.

He passed the 19-metre barrier in 1988 with 19.92 metres, achieved in August in Osijek, and the 20-metre barrier in 1988 with 20.42 metres, achieved in September in Kranj. He improved this further to 20.47 metres in 1991, 20.91 metres in 1992 and 21.26 metres in 1993, all achieved in Belgrade. Two more meagre years followed before he came close in 1996 with 20.90 metres, achieved in August in Niš.

Later career
After his success with international medals, the achievements became rarer. He finished eighth at the 1996 Olympic Games, fourth at the 1998 European Indoor Championships, fourth at the 1998 European Championships, sixth at the 1999 World Championships and fifth at the 2001 World Championships. He also competed at the 1997 World Championships, the 2000 Olympic Games, the 2003 World Championships, the 2004 Olympic Games and the 2005 World Championships without reaching the final.

Perić became Balkan champion in 1996, 1998 and 2003.

He became Yugoslav shot put champion every year from 1991 through 2001, except for one year, 1995. He also became discus champion in 1992, 1993, 1994 and 1997. When the country Serbia and Montenegro was formed he won several national titles there too.

He set his personal best in the shot put in this period, with 21.77 metres in April 1998 in Bar, Montenegro. He never threw over 21 metres again. He failed to even pass 20 metres in 2000 and 2002, but continued setting such marks for some years. His last season over 20 metres was in 2006, when he put 20.34 metres in September in Zenica. In the discus throw his personal best throw was 61.94 metres, achieved in May 1991 in Belgrade. Both results are Serbian records.

Competition record

See also
Serbian records in athletics

References

1964 births
Living people
Sportspeople from Tuzla
Serbs of Bosnia and Herzegovina
Serbian male shot putters
Serbian male discus throwers
Yugoslav male shot putters
Yugoslav male discus throwers
Serbia and Montenegro athletes
Olympic athletes as Independent Olympic Participants
Athletes (track and field) at the 1992 Summer Olympics
Olympic athletes of Yugoslavia
Athletes (track and field) at the 1996 Summer Olympics
Olympic athletes of Serbia and Montenegro
Athletes (track and field) at the 2000 Summer Olympics
Athletes (track and field) at the 2004 Summer Olympics
World Athletics Championships athletes for Yugoslavia
World Athletics Championships athletes for Serbia and Montenegro